Anna Paulowna is a former municipality and a town in the Netherlands, in the province of North Holland. The former municipality derives its name from the Anna Paulownapolder, which was laid dry in 1846 during the reign of King William II of the Netherlands and in turn named after his wife, Queen Anna Paulowna of Russia. Since 2012, Anna Paulowna has been a part of the new municipality of Hollands Kroon.

Population centres 

The former municipality of Anna Paulowna consisted of the following cities, towns, villages and/or districts: Anna Paulowna, Breezand, Nieuwesluis, Van Ewijcksluis, and Wieringerwaard.

Transportation

The town is served by Anna Paulowna railway station.

Local government 

The former municipal council of Anna Paulowna consisted of 15 seats. After the Dutch municipal elections of 2010 the seats were divided as follows:

 PvdA - 4 seats
 CDA - 5 seats
 VVD - 5 seats
 Lijst F.A. Leal - 1 seat

See also
 Zeeuws spek

References 

 Statistics are taken from the SDU Staatscourant

Municipalities of the Netherlands disestablished in 2012
Former municipalities of North Holland
Populated places in North Holland
Hollands Kroon